St. Thomas Synagogue is a historic synagogue at 2116 Crystal Gade, Queens Quarters, in Charlotte Amalie on the island of Saint Thomas in the U.S. Virgin Islands. The formal name of the synagogue is  Congregation Beracha Veshalom Vegmiluth Hasadim. It was declared a National Historic Landmark in 1997.

History
The congregation was founded in 1796 by Spanish and Portuguese Sephardic Jews who had come to the Caribbean Basin to finance trade between Europe and the New World.  The building was constructed in 1833, and is the second oldest synagogue in the United States (after Touro Synagogue in Newport, Rhode Island built in 1763). As a result of Hurricanes Irma and Maria, Category 5 hurricanes which ravaged much of the Caribbean and St. Thomas in September 2017, the synagogue sustained significant damage, but has remained in continuous operation under the leadership of Rabbi Michael Feshbach.

Description

The St. Thomas Synagogue stands north of Charlotte Amalie's central business district, on the north side of Crystal Gade near its junction with Raadets Gade. It is a single-story structure, built out of rubblestone joined by a mortar mix of lime, sand, and molasses, and covered by a shallow pitch hip roof. Its front, separated from the street by an entry courtyard, has a Greek Revival temple front, but with Gothic arched window openings. The facade is recessed, with the temple pediment supported by brick pillars with Tuscan styling. On the interior, the Torah ark is located on the east wall, with the tevah (i.e. bimah or pulpit), on a dais against the west wall. The center of the chamber is demarcated by a square of four Ionic columns mounted on pedestals, and there are rows of bench pews on the north and south walls. The seating areas of men and women are separated by movable wooden partitions.

See also
 List of United States National Historic Landmarks in United States commonwealths and territories, associated states, and foreign states
 National Register of Historic Places listings in the United States Virgin Islands

References

External links
 
 

Historic district contributing properties in the United States Virgin Islands
National Historic Landmarks in the United States Virgin Islands
Portuguese-Jewish culture in the United States
Properties of religious function on the National Register of Historic Places in the United States Virgin Islands
Reform synagogues in the United States
Synagogues completed in 1833
Charlotte Amalie, U.S. Virgin Islands
Sephardi Jewish culture in the Caribbean
Sephardi Jewish culture in the United States
Sephardi Reform Judaism
Sephardi synagogues
Spanish-Jewish culture in the United States
Synagogues on the National Register of Historic Places
Synagogues in the United States Virgin Islands
1830s establishments in the Caribbean
1833 establishments in North America